Palaeontology in Wales is palaeontological research occurring in Wales.

Cambrian period 
 Anebolithus is a genus of trilobites found in Gilwern Hill, Powys, Wales. Anebolithus, like other trinucleids, was blind.
 Homagnostus is a genus of trilobite in the order Agnostida, which existed in what is now north Wales. It was described by Howell in 1935. The genus was originally considered to be Agnostus pisiformis var. obesus (Belt, 1867).

Ordovician period 
 Lloydolithus is a genus of trilobites from the Late Ordovician of Wales.
 Ogygiocarella Brongniart, 1822, is a genus of asaphid trilobites. It occurred during the Middle Ordovician.

Triassic dinosaurs

Pantydraco 

Pantydraco (where "panty-" is short for Pant-y-ffynnon, signifying hollow of the spring/well in Welsh, referring to the quarry at Bonvilston in South Wales where it was found) was a genus of basal sauropodomorph dinosaur from the Late Triassic of Wales. It is based on a partial juvenile skeleton once thought to belong to Thecodontosaurus. Only one valid species of Pantydraco is recognised: P. caducus.

Pendraig 
Pendraig (meaning "chief dragon" in Middle Welsh) is a genus of coelophysoid theropod dinosaur from South Wales. It contains one species, Pendraig milnerae, named after Angela Milner. The specimen was discovered in the Pant-y-Ffynnon quarry. In life it would have measured one metre in length.

Jurassic Wales

Paceyodon 
Paceyodon is an extinct genus of morganucodontan from Early Jurassic deposits of south Wales. Paceyodon is known from an isolated molariform that is significantly larger than any morganucodontan molariform yet discovered. It was collected in the Pant Quarry, Vale of Glamorgan. It was first named by William A. Clemens in 2011 and the type species is Paceyodon davidi.

Dracoraptor 

Dracoraptor (meaning "dragon thief") is a genus of coelophysoid dinosaur that lived during the Hettangian stage of the Early Jurassic Period of what is now Wales dated at 201.3 ± 0.2 million years old.

The fossil was first discovered in 2014 by Rob and Nick Hanigan and Sam Davies at the Blue Lias Formation on the South Wales coast. The genus name Dracoraptor is from Draco referring to the Welsh dragon and raptor, meaning robber, a commonly employed suffix for theropod dinosaurs with the type species being Dracoraptor hanigani. It is the oldest known Jurassic dinosaur and is the first dinosaur skeleton from the Jurassic of Wales.

See also
Geology of Wales

References 
Wales
Science and technology in Wales
Geology of Wales
Natural history of Wales